The 2011–12 Danish 1st Division season is the 16th season of the Danish 1st Division league championship, governed by the Danish Football Association. It is set to start on 12 August 2011 with Viborg FF facing off against FC Hjørring. The final matches of the season are scheduled for 10 June 2012.

This will be the only season with a fourteen-club First Division. As only one team will be promoted from the Second Divisions, the league will be reduced to twelve teams from the next season, switching to the same system as the Superliga with three round-robin rounds and two relegation spots.

The division-champion and runners-up are promoted to the 2012–13 Danish Superliga. The teams in the 12th, 13th and 14th places are relegated to the 2012–13 Danish 2nd Divisions.

Participants

League table

Managerial changes

See also
2011–12 in Danish football

References

External links
  Danish FA

2
Danish 1st Division
Danish 1st Division seasons